I Laugh Sabado is a Philippine television variety show broadcast by Q. Directed by Bibeth Orteza, it premiered on April 24, 2010. The show concluded on February 19, 2011.

Overview
I Laugh Sabado was a comedy variety show of Q Channel 11 which featured sketches and musical numbers. It was hosted by an ensemble of Filipino comedians and character actors, Wally Bayola, Paolo Paraiso, Gee Canlas, Jana Dominguez, Jan Manual, Alfred Marquez, and Archie Alemania. It was directed by Bibeth Orteza.

The show, admits Paolo, is patterned after the long-running US show, Saturday Night Live. I Laugh Sabado will have gags, sketches, skits and a knock-knock portion. We have a celebrity guest every week who will serve as the show's host. There will also be a band and dancers."

Cast
Wally Bayola
 Wally is currently seen in the longest running noon time show in the Philippines, Eat Bulaga!. He starred in the movie Scaregivers in which he and Jose Manalo were the lead actors. His colleagues in I Laugh Sabado are calling him big brother because Wally is veteran when it comes to comedy." He's the lead comedian in I Laugh Sabado.
Paolo Paraiso
Paolo is often seen in some shows of GMA Network particularly the near-ending fantaserye Panday Kids and to the recently concluded Sine Novela Kaya Kong Abutin ang Langit. Paolo is the father to actress Mylene Dizon's kids, and a brother to Bubbles Paraiso. He also has a show entitled "Bluffing" together with Bodie Cruz.
Janna Dominguez
Gee Canlas
Jan Manual
Being known as PacBoy as one of the segment hosts of Startalk, Jan was also part of the reality show StarStruck where he was part of the Batch Four. Last 2008, Jan recovered from an accident in the KapusOlympics Watermania 2008.
Archie Alemania
 Archie is part of ABS-CBN's Star Magic and his last appearance before his I Laugh Sabado's stint is George and Cecil. Archie is Mickey Ferriols' former live - in boyfriend and they have a son.
XLR8
a sing and dance boy group in the Philippines under VIVA Records' P-Pop Label. XLR8 is composed of, Hideaki Torio, Carlo Lazerna, the identical twins MJ and MM Magno, AJ Muhlach, Kiko Ramos, Arkin Del Rosario, Caleb Santos.

References

2010 Philippine television series debuts
2011 Philippine television series endings
Filipino-language television shows
Philippine variety television shows
Q (TV network) original programming